The Wezel Apis 2 is a German mid-wing, T-tailed, single-seat motor glider that was designed and produced by Wezel Flugzeugtechnik. It first flew in 2002.

Often confused with the very similar Albastar Apis, the two designs are not related.

The rights to the Apis 2 design were sold to Yuneec International of China in 2011 with the intention of selling only an electric version. Wezel announced in June 2012 that the move of production had been delayed indefinitely.

Design and development
The Apis 2 is a retractable engine motor glider that is powered by a  Hirth F-33 single cylinder, two-stroke powerplant, fitted with a tractor propeller. The engine is retracted into a bay behind the cockpit for soaring flight. The Apis 2 is built predominantly of composites. The  span wing features winglets and produces a 39:1 glide ratio. The landing gear is a retractable monowheel gear.

In 2003 the aircraft was offered for €50,950 complete.

Specifications (Apis 2)

See also

References

External links

2000s German sailplanes
T-tail aircraft
Motor gliders
Aircraft first flown in 2002
Mid-wing aircraft
Single-engined tractor aircraft